Stuart Surridge (3 September 1917 – 13 April 1992) was an English first-class cricketer who played for Surrey. Though not known to be a remarkable batsman or bowler, Surridge became one of the most successful team captains in the history of County Championship cricket. When not playing cricket, Surridge worked at his family's sport equipment business.

Career 
Surridge was born at Herne Hill in south London, educated at Emanuel School, and died at Glossop in Derbyshire. Surridge was one of the most successful cricket captains in County Championship history. Through aggressive tactics, he turned an under-performing Surrey team into a record-breaking success in the 1950s. Surrey won the title in each of the five years he was captain, from 1952 to 1956, and then won two more under Peter May to create a sequence that has not been equalled.

Surridge came from a famous family of cricket bat makers. He was only a moderate cricketer: a lower order batsman and a right-arm fast-medium bowler who was, by the standards of his time, somewhat expensive. He was 30 before he played in a first-class match, and usually he was only selected for the first team if other players were injured or on Test duty.

Surrey's team in the early 1950s included several top-class bowlers. Alec Bedser was the main strike bowler for England for ten seasons after the Second World War; Jim Laker was amongst the best off spin bowler in the country; Tony Lock was an aggressive slow left-arm bowler; and Peter Loader. Batting resources were thinner, but in Peter May Surrey had a talented batsman. Despite having these players, Surrey lacked success until Surridge was appointed team captain after the 1951 season. They had shared the 1950 Championship with Lancashire but that was their only success since before the First World War.

Surridge's belief was that bowlers and catches win matches, and he aimed to win as many matches as he could. He himself was a fearless fielder close to the wicket, and he encouraged others to follow his example. In his five years as captain, only in 1953 did Surrey win less than half their matches; in 1955, the county won 23 out of 28 games, losing the other five and going through the whole season without a single draw. His tactics were sometimes ruthless. In one match against a weak Worcestershire, having dismissed his opponents for a total of 25 runs, Surridge declared the Surrey innings closed at just 92 for three wickets, and bowled Worcestershire out again for 40 to win by an innings and 27 runs. The weather forecast had not been good, he said. Even when Surrey's Test cricketers were playing for England, Surridge could inspire their replacements to perform well.

Surridge was recognised when he was named as a Wisden Cricketer of the Year in 1953 and was chosen as President of Surrey in 1981 (his widow, Betty, was president in 1997). In retirement after 1956, he served on Surrey committees and ran his bat-making business, and was visiting his factory when he collapsed and died, aged 74. His son, also called Stuart, played once for Surrey in 1978.

Stuart Surridge & Co
In 1867, Percy Stuart Surridge, Stuart Surridge's grandfather started a company repairing cricket bats. The business expanded, making a host of equipment including the Rapid Driver cricket bat that had a reinforced toe (patent no. 19386/28) which was used by W. G. Grace, K. S. Ranjitsinhji, C. B. Fry and Don Bradman amongst others. In 1923 the company received a patent for their design in reinforcing tennis rackets to stop strings fraying, and produced a variety of equipment for sports, including hockey. The business was originally based at 175 Borough High Street, London, before they opened factories including their main base in Witham, Essex and a willow farm in Aldermaston.

During the 1950s Stuart Surridge worked with his brother Percy at the business, introducing the SS logo during the 1960s. The company introduced the Cobbler football during this time, which was used in the Bundesliga and the 1976 League Cup final. During the 1970s Surridge entered the big hitter cricket bat market with its Jumbo, which was used by Viv Richards and Clive Rice. In 1979, Surridge manufactured the official ball of the English Football League, along with Mitre and Minerva, with their version being called the UFO and was recognisable by its red stripe. The ball was most famously used by Justin Fashanu in the 1980 F.A. Cup match against Liverpool to score that year's BBC Goal of the Season.

In the 1980s, John Surridge, Stuart's nephew and Percy's son designed the Turbo cricket bat. It was revolutionary as it was made from several pieces of timber glued together, with the glue flexing to give the batsman more power. The bat was most famously used by Graham Gooch in 1990 to score his record 333 against India. 
 
During the 1980s the company provided Jimmy White with snooker cues, launching a Jimmy White range of cues for sale. In 1991 the company sponsored Paul Gascoigne. In the early 1990s the company went to court in India over the use of the SS branding, which was also used by Sareen Sports Industries.

Surridge died in 1992 at age 74 while visiting one of the company's factories in Glossop. In 1993, after the death of Stuart  Surridge, the family sold the business to Dunlop Slazenger. The Surridge brand was sold on to a group of Indian and South African investors in 2000, before being purchased by The SDL Group, based in Burnley in 2003.

References

 Wisden Cricket Almanack 1993

External links

Stuart Surridge – Cricketer of the Year, 1953
Surridge Sports

People from Herne Hill
English cricketers
Surrey cricketers
Surrey cricket captains
Presidents of Surrey County Cricket Club
Wisden Cricketers of the Year
1917 births
1992 deaths
Minor Counties cricketers
Marylebone Cricket Club cricketers
Gentlemen cricketers
North v South cricketers
People educated at Emanuel School
T. N. Pearce's XI cricketers
Sportswear brands